Raines is a surname, and may refer to:

People
 Annie Raines (born 1969), American musician in the duo Paul Rishell and Annie Raines
 Cristina Raines (born 1952), American actress
 Ella Raines (1920–1988), American actress
 Franklin Raines (born 1949), former Fannie Mae director and White House budget director
 George Raines (1846–1908), New York politician
 Hazel Jane Raines (1916–1956), pioneering aviator, first woman licensed pilot in Georgia
 Howell Raines (born 1943), former executive editor of The New York Times
 John Raines (1840–1909), New York politician, namesake of the Raines law
 Matthew Raines (born 1982), Pathologist and U.S. Air Force officer
 Ron Raines (born 1949), American actor and musician
 Ronald T. Raines (born 1958), American chemical biologist
 Steve Raines (1916–1996), American actor and stuntman
 Thomas Raines (1842–1924), New York State Treasurer
 Tim Raines (born 1959), American baseball player
 Tim Raines Jr. (born 1979), American baseball player
 Tony Raines (born 1964), American racecar driver

Fictional characters
 Audrey Raines, fictional character in the TV series 24, portrayed by actress Kim Raver
 Cid Raines, from the video game Final Fantasy XIII, voiced by Erik Davies
 Letty Raines, fictional character in the TV series Good Behavior, portrayed by actress Michelle Dockery
 Lily Raines, fictional character in the movie In the Line of Fire portrayed by actress Rene Russo
 Memphis Raines, fictional character in the movie Gone in 60 Seconds, portrayed by actor Nicolas Cage
 Detective Michael Raines, fictional character in the TV series Raines, portrayed by actor Jeff Goldblum
 Dr. William Raines, fictional character in the TV series The Pretender, portrayed by actor Richard Marcus
 Reno Raines, fictional character in the TV series Renegade, portrayed by actor Lorenzo Lamas

See also
 Raines (disambiguation)
 Raine (disambiguation)